The Joseph F. Keithley Award For Advances in Measurement Science is an award of the American Physical Society (APS) that was first awarded in 1998. It is named in honor of Joseph F. Keithley, the founder of Keithley Instruments. The award is presented annually for outstanding contributions in measurement techniques and equipment, and is sponsored by Keithley Instruments and the Topical Group on Instrument and Measurement Science (GIMS).

The award is not to be confused with the similarly-named IEEE Joseph F. Keithley Award in Instrumentation and Measurement of the Institute of Electrical and Electronics Engineers (IEEE), which is also endowed by Keithley Instruments.

Recipients
The award has been given to the following people.

2022: Daniel Rugar and John Mamin
2021: Irfan Siddiqi
2020: No award given.
2019: Zahid Hussain
2018: Andreas J. Heinrich, Joseph A. Stroscio, Wilson Ho
2017: Peter Denes
2016: Albert Migliori
2015: Daniel T. Pierce, John Unguris, Robert J. Celotta
2014: Franz Josef Giessibl
2013: David McClelland, Nergis Mavalvala, Roman Schnabel
2012: Andreas Mandelis
2011: Ian Walmsley
2010: Eugene Ivanov
2009: Robert J. Schoelkopf
2008: Bjorn Wannberg
2007: Kent D. Irwin
2006: Frances Hellman
2005: E. Dwight Adams
2004: Virgil Bruce Elings
2003: Arthur Ashkin
2002: Robert J. Soulen, Jr.
2001: James E. Faller
2000: Calvin Forrest Quate, H. Kumar Wickramasinghe
1999: Simon Foner
1998: John Clarke

See also
 List of physics awards

References

Awards of the American Physical Society
Measurement